Kandar is a village in Abbottabad District of Khyber-Pakhtunkhwa. It is located at 34°6'40N 73°9'25E with an altitude of 1209 metres (3969 feet). Neighbouring settlements include Chhar, Batangi and Jandala.

References

Populated places in Abbottabad District